Moorland is a type of habitat found in upland areas.

Moorland may also refer to:

Places

Australia 

 Moorland, Queensland, a locality in the Bundaberg Region

United Kingdom 

 Carlton-le-Moorland
 Moorland, Somerset

United States 

 Moorland, Iowa
 Moorland, Kentucky
 Moorland Township, Michigan

Other 
 Moorland (HM Prison), Category C prison located Hatfield Woodhouse, South Yorkshire, England (renamed from Moorland Closed (HM Prison) in 2010)
 Moorland Open (HM Prison), Category D prison located Hatfield Woodhouse, South Yorkshire, England (renamed Hatfield Prison in 2010)
 Moorland-Spingarn Research Center, repository at Howard University in Washington, D.C., United States, for the documentation of the history and culture of people of African descent in Africa
 Daydream – Moorland, soundtrack album by the German electronic music group Tangerine Dream, for the TV series Tatort
 Jesse E. Moorland, Black minister, community executive, and civic leader from Ohio, United States

See also 
 Mooreland (disambiguation)
 Moreland (disambiguation)
 Moorlands (disambiguation)